Mehari Shinash is an Eritrean footballer. He played for the Eritrea national football team.

International career
Shinash played in the 2009 CECAFA Cup in Kenya, where his cross was deflected in for an own goal in the 3–1 victory against Somalia.

Personal life
He was born from an Ethiopian father and an Eritrean mother in Asmara, Eritrea.
Whilst competing in the 2009 CECAFA Cup in Kenya he was part of the Eritrea national football team which failed to return home after competing in the regional tournament in Nairobi. After receiving refugee status from the Australian government, the team moved to Adelaide, Australia.

References

External links
 

Living people
Eritrean footballers
Eritrea international footballers
Association football forwards
Year of birth missing (living people)
Expatriate soccer players in Australia
Eritrean refugees
Eritrean people of Ethiopian descent
Sportspeople from Asmara